Muslim Magomedovich Salikhov (born June 9, 1984), is a Russian mixed martial artist and Sanda fighter who currently competes in welterweight division of the Ultimate Fighting Championship (UFC).  A multiple time Wushu Sanda world champion, Salikhov occupies a place alongside Hossein Ojaghi as one of only two non-Chinese athletes to have won the Wushu Sanda King's Cup.

Personal life
Muslim Salikhov was born in Buynaksk, Dagestan; his ethnicity is Kumyk. In 1995, he began to practice Wushu Sanda at the Five Directions of the World, a school famous for combining general and martial arts education.

Muslim is an alumnus of the famous Dagestani sports-dedicated boarding school Five Directions of the World.

Wushu

Wushu Sanda 
Salikhov faced Liu Hailong who held the title "King of Sanda" at the 2003 World Wushu Championships in Macau. Both were evenly matched, with Liu Hailong declared the winner. Salikhov was the Sanshou champion at the 2004 European Wushu Championships held in Moscow and he became the World Champion in 2005. Muslim Salikhov is often acknowledged as one of the best Wushu Sanda competitors in history.

In February 2006, he participated in the first international "King of Sanda" tournament in Chongqing and became the first non-Chinese to win the title. He again won the world title in 2007 and 2009. At the World Wushu Championships, he became one of the most decorated sanda athletes of all time and was the first sanda athlete to win five gold medals. He was also a gold medalist at the 2008 Beijing Wushu Tournament, and won medals at the 2009 World Games and the World Combat Games.

Mixed martial arts

Early career
Salikhov made his professional MMA debut in July 2011. Over the next year and a half, he earned a record of two wins and one loss.

M-1 Global
By early 2013, Salikhov signed with M-1 Global, preparing with Phuket Top Team for his mixed martial arts debut. He fought three times for the promotion, going undefeated during this run.

Other promotions
Beginning in 2015, Salikhov fought for various regional promotions in China and Russia. He has fought seven times over the last two years, again remaining undefeated in this run with six of the sevens wins coming via knockout.

Salikhov notched his biggest win to date when he earned a victory over UFC and Bellator vet Melvin Guillard by spinning hook kick.

Ultimate Fighting Championship
On October 19, 2017, Salikhov signed with the UFC.

In his debut for the promotion, Salikhov faced Alex Garcia on November 25, 2017 at UFC Fight Night 122. He lost the fight via submission in the second round.

Salikhov faced Abdul Razak Alhassan on April 14, 2018 on UFC on FOX 29. However, Alhassan was pulled from the card, citing injury, and he was replaced  by promotional newcomer Ricky Rainey.  He won the fight via technical knock out in round two.

On July 20, 2018, Salikhov was notified of a potential doping violation by USADA from an out-of-competition sample collected on June 7, 2018. On March 4, 2019 Salikhov was cleared of USADA suspension as USADA could not determine if Salikhov had ingested oral Turinabol a year before he was signed to the UFC and entered the USADA drug-testing program.

Salikhov faced Nordine Taleb on September 7, 2019 at UFC 242. He won the fight via knockout in the first round. This win earned him the Performance of the Night award.

Salikhov faced  Laureano Staropoli on October 26, 2019 at UFC on ESPN+ 20. He won the fight via unanimous decision.

Salikhov was expected to face Niko Price on April 11, 2020 at UFC Fight Night: Overeem vs. Harris. However, due to the COVID-19 pandemic, the event was eventually postponed and pairing scrapped.

Salikhov faced Elizeu Zaleski dos Santos on July 11, 2020 at UFC 251. He won the fight via a split decision.

Salikhov was scheduled to face Cláudio Silva on October 18, 2020 at UFC Fight Night 180. However on October 4, it was announced that Salikhov pulled out due to undisclosed reasons and was replaced by James Krause.

Salikhov was scheduled to face Santiago Ponzinibbio on January 16, 2021 at UFC on ABC 1.  However, Salikhov pulled out of the bout in mid-December citing health issues after contracting COVID-19.

Salikhov faced Francisco Trinaldo on June 5, 2021 at UFC Fight Night 189. He won the fight via unanimous decision.

Salikhov was scheduled to face Michel Pereira on January 15, 2022 at UFC on ESPN 32. However, Salikhov withdrew from the bout for undisclosed reasons and the bout was cancelled.

Salikhov faced Li Jingliang on July 16, 2022, at UFC on ABC 3. He lost the fight via technical knockout in the second round.

Salikhov  faced André Fialho  on November 19, 2022, at UFC Fight Night 215. He won the fight via technical knockout in round three. With this win, Salikhov earned the Performance of the Night award.

Championships and accomplishments
Ultimate Fighting Championship
Performance of the Night (Two times)

Mixed martial arts record

|-
|Win
|align=center|19–3
|André Fialho
|TKO (spinning wheel kick and punches)
|UFC Fight Night: Nzechukwu vs. Cuțelaba
|
|align=center|3
|align=center|1:03
||Las Vegas, Nevada, United States
|
|-
|Loss
|align=center|18–3
|Li Jingliang
|TKO (punches and elbows)
|UFC on ABC: Ortega vs. Rodríguez
|
|align=center|2
|align=center|4:38
|Elmont, New York, United States
|
|-
|Win
|align=center|18–2
|Francisco Trinaldo
|Decision (unanimous)
|UFC Fight Night: Rozenstruik vs. Sakai
|
|align=center|3
|align=center|5:00
|Las Vegas, Nevada, United States
|
|-
|Win
|align=center|17–2
|Elizeu Zaleski dos Santos
|Decision (split)
|UFC 251
|
|align=center|3
|align=center|5:00
|Abu Dhabi, United Arab Emirates
|  
|-
|Win
|align=center|16–2
|Laureano Staropoli
|Decision (unanimous)
|UFC Fight Night: Maia vs. Askren
|
|align=center|3
|align=center|5:00
|Kallang, Singapore
|
|-
|Win
|align=center|15–2
|Nordine Taleb
|KO (punch)
|UFC 242
|
|align=center|1
|align=center|4:26
|Abu Dhabi, United Arab Emirates
|
|- 
|Win
|align=center|14–2
|Ricky Rainey
|KO (punches)
|UFC on Fox: Poirier vs. Gaethje
|
|align=center|2
|align=center|3:56
|Glendale, Arizona, United States
|
|-
|Loss
|align=center|13–2
|Alex Garcia
|Submission (rear-naked choke)
|UFC Fight Night: Bisping vs. Gastelum
|
|align=center|2
|align=center|3:22
|Shanghai, China
|
|-
|Win
|align=center|13–1
|Melvin Guillard
|KO (spinning hook kick)
|Kunlun Fight MMA 12
|
|align=center|1
|align=center|1:33
|Yantai, China
|
|-
|Win
|align=center|12–1
|Akoundou Epelet Evy Johannes
|Submission (arm-triangle choke)
|International Pro Fighting Championship: YunFeg Showdown
|
|align=center|1
|align=center|3:23
|Shandong, China
|
|-
|Win
|align=center|11–1
|Ivan Jorge
|KO (spinning back kick)
|Kunlun Fight: Cage Fight Series 6
|
|align=center|1
|align=center|1:04
|Yiwu, China
|
|-
|Win
|align=center|10–1
|Gang Zhang
|Submission (arm-triangle choke)
|Superstar Fight 3
|
|align=center|1
|align=center|N/A
|Harbin, China
|
|-
|Win
|align=center|9–1
|Artem Shokalo
|KO (spinning back kick)
|Cage Fighting: Dagestan
|
|align=center|1
|align=center|2:31
|Makhachkala, Russia
|
|-
|Win
|align=center|8–1
|Kurbanjiang Tuluosibake
|TKO (spinning back kick and punches)
|Bullets Fly FC 3
|
|align=center|1
|align=center|0:18
|Hebei, China
|
|-
|Win
|align=center|7–1
|Tsuyoshi Yamashita
|TKO (punches)
|W.I.N. FC
|
|align=center|1
|align=center|N/A
|Guangdong, China
|
|-
|Win
|align=center|6–1
|Gele Qing
|KO (punches)
|CKF World Federation: Zhong Wu Ultimate Fighting
|
|align=center|1
|align=center|3:50
|Beijing, China
|
|-
|Win
|align=center|5–1
|Victor Sckoteski
|TKO (punches)
|M-1 Challenge 53
|
|align=center|1
|align=center|4:27
|Beijing, China
|
|-
|Win
|align=center|4–1
|Filip Kotarlic
|KO (punch)
|M-1 Challenge 44
|
|align=center|1
|align=center|3:05
|Tula, Russia
|
|-
|Win
|align=center|3–1
|Deyan Topalski
|Decision (unanimous)
|M-1 Challenge 38
|
|align=center|3
|align=center|5:00
|Saint Petersburg, Russia
|
|-
|Loss
|align=center|2–1
|Kris Hocum
|Submission (rear-naked choke)
|Beirut Elite Fighting Championship: First Blood
|
|align=center|1
|align=center|1:40
|Beirut, Lebanon
|
|-
|Win
|align=center|2–0
|Dankao Sakda
|KO (punch)
|Top of the Forbidden City 4
|
|align=center|1
|align=center|6:56
|Beijing, China
|
|-
|Win
|align=center|1–0
|Wang Hong Tao
|TKO (arm injury)
|Top of the Forbidden City 2
|
|align=center|1
|align=center|0:51
|Beijing, China
|
|-

Sanda and kickboxing professional record (incomplete) 

|- bgcolor="#CCFFCC"
| 2017-07-16 || Win || align=left| Fang Qingquan || Fight King international Championship Final || Lantian, China || Decision (Unanimous) || 3 || 3:00
|-
|- bgcolor="#CCFFCC"
| 2016-12-10 || Win || align=left| Nuerla Mulali || Kunlun Fight 55 80 kg 2016 Tournament Reserve Fight || Qingdao, China ||KO (Spinning Backfist) || 2 || 2:00
|-
|- bgcolor="#CCFFCC"
| 2016-01-31 || Win || align=left| Fu Gaofeng || Changbai Mountain Hero 2016 || Jilin, China || Decision (Unanimous) || 3 || 3:00
|-
|- bgcolor="#FFBBBB"
| 2014-01-11 || Loss || align=left| Nuerla Mulali || Hongdu Real estate & Qiancheng group Championship || Dalian, China || Decision (Unanimous) || 3 || 3:00
|-
|- bgcolor="#FFBBBB"
| 2012-12-31 || Loss ||align=left| Xu Yi || Wu Lin Feng Global Kung Fu Festival || Beijing, China || Decision (Unanimous) || 3 || 3:00
|-
|- bgcolor="#CCFFCC"
| 2012-01-01 || Win ||align=left| Li Baoming || Ultimate Fighter 2012 || Changsha, China || Decision (Unanimous) || 3 || 3:00
|-
|- bgcolor="#FFBBBB"
| 2011-10-22 || Loss ||align=left| Fu Gaofeng || Shandong Heroes 2011 || Yantai, China || Decision (Unanimous) || 3 || 3:00
|-
! style=background:white colspan=9 |
|-
|- bgcolor="#CCFFCC"
| 2011-06-18 || Win ||align=left| Li Baoming || WBC Muaythai China Championships || Hunan, China || Decision (Unanimous)   || 3 || 3:00
|-
|- bgcolor="#CCFFCC"
| 2011-04-23 || Win ||align=left| Guo Qiang || WBC Muaythai China Championships || Nanning, China || KO || 2 || 
|-
|- bgcolor="#FFBBBB"
| 2011-01-18 || Loss ||align=left| Fu Jiachun || 2011 China vs Russia Sanshou Tournament -80 kg || Harbin, China || Decision (Unanimous) || 3 || 3:00
|-
|- bgcolor="#FFBBBB"
| 2009-07-17 || Loss ||align=left| Steve McKinnon || 1st World Kung Fu King Championship (世界功夫王争霸赛) 75–90 kg, Quarter Finals || Guangzhou, China || Decision (Unanimous) || 5 || 5:00
|-
|- bgcolor="#CCFFCC"
| 2009-06-26 || Win || align=left| Stéphane Attelly || 1er Gala International Multi-boxes || Paris, France ||  ||  || 
|-
|- bgcolor="#FFBBBB"
| 2009-03-14 || Loss || align=left| Yu Jin || 4th Kung Fu King Tournament (国际武术搏击争霸赛), Finals || Chongqing, China || KO || 2 || 
|-
! style=background:white colspan=9 |
|-
|- bgcolor="#CCFFCC"
| 2009-03-14 || Win || align=left| Xu Jiaheng || 4th Kung Fu King Tournament (国际武术搏击争霸赛), Semi Finals || Chongqing, China || Decision (Unanimous) || 3 || 3:00
|-
|- bgcolor="#CCFFCC"
| 2009-03-12 || Win || align=left| Yang Yuanfei || 4th Kung Fu King Tournament (国际武术搏击争霸赛), Quarter Finals || Chongqing, China || KO || 2 || 
|-
|- bgcolor="#CCFFCC"
| 2009-03-10 || Win || align=left| Eduardo Bernadette Filho || 4th Kung Fu King Tournament (国际武术搏击争霸赛), 1/8 Finals || Chongqing, China || KO || 2 || 
|-
|- bgcolor="#CCFFCC"
| 2007-08-01 || Win || align=left| Fang Bian || 2007 China vs Russia Sanshou Tournament -80 kg || Harbin, China ||Decision (Unanimous) || 3 || 3:00
|-
|- bgcolor="#FFBBBB"
| 2007-03-23 || Loss || align=left| Bai Jinbin || 2nd Kung Fu King Tournament (国际武术搏击争霸赛), Semi Finals || Chongqing, China || Decision (Unanimous) || 3 || 3:00
|-
|- bgcolor="#CCFFCC"
| 2006-02-26 || Win || align=left| Gele Qing || 1st Kung Fu King Tournament (国际武术搏击争霸赛), Finals || Chongqing, China ||Decision (Unanimous) || 3 || 3:00
|-
! style=background:white colspan=9 |
|- bgcolor="#CCFFCC"
| 2006-02-26 || Win || align=left| Zhang Tingbin || 1st Kung Fu King Tournament (国际武术搏击争霸赛), Semi Finals || Chongqing, China ||Decision (Unanimous) || 3 || 3:00
|-
|- bgcolor="#CCFFCC"
| 2006-02-25 || Win || align=left| Aotegen Bateer || 1st Kung Fu King Tournament (国际武术搏击争霸赛), Quarter Finals || Chongqing, China ||Decision (Unanimous) || 3 || 3:00
|- bgcolor="#CCFFCC"
| 2006-02-24 || Win || align=left| Xue Fengqiang || 1st Kung Fu King Tournament (国际武术搏击争霸赛), 1/8 Finals || Chongqing, China ||Decision (Unanimous) || 3 || 3:00
|-

Sanda amateur record (incomplete) 

|-
|- bgcolor="#CCFFCC"
| 2015-11-17 || Win || align=left| Fu Gaofeng ||  13th World Wushu Championships, Final || Jakarta, Indonesia || Decision || 3 || 2:00
|-
|- bgcolor="#CCFFCC"
| 2015-11-17 || Win || align=left| Bagdat Kenzhetayev ||  13th World Wushu Championships, Semi Finals || Jakarta, Indonesia || Decision || 3 || 2:00
|-
|- bgcolor="#CCFFCC"
| 2015-11-17 || Win || align=left| Moumou Abdelhakim ||  13th World Wushu Championships, Quarter Finals || Jakarta, Indonesia || Decision || 3 || 2:00
|-
|- bgcolor="#FFBBBB"
| 2013-11-05 || Loss || align=left| Amir Fazli || 12th World Wushu Championships, Final || Kuala Lumpur, Malaysia || Decision (2-1) || 3 || 2:00
|-
|- bgcolor="#CCFFCC"
| 2013-11-04 || Win || align=left| Alejandro Cisne || 12th World Wushu Championships, Semi Finals || Kuala Lumpur, Malaysia || Decision (2-0) || 2 || 2:00 
|-
|- bgcolor="#CCFFCC"
| 2013-11-03 || Win || align=left| Mergen Bilyalov || 12th World Wushu Championships, Quarter Finals || Kuala Lumpur, Malaysia || Decision (2-0) || 2 || 2:00
|-
|- bgcolor="#CCFFCC"
| 2013-11-02 || Win || align=left| Rolich Vadzim || 12th World Wushu Championships, 1/8 Finals || Kuala Lumpur, Malaysia || Decision (2-0) || 2 || 2:00
|-
|- bgcolor="#CCFFCC"
| 2013-10-26 || Win || align=left| Nacereddine Zemmal || 2nd World Combat Games, Final || Saint Petersburg, Russia || ||  || 
|-
|- bgcolor="#CCFFCC"
| 2013-10-25 || Win || align=left| Ashraf Mohamed Abdelgawad Abdelhamid || 2nd World Combat Games, Semi Finals || Saint Petersburg, Russia ||  ||  ||  
|-
|- bgcolor="#CCFFCC"
| 2011-10-15 || Win || align=left| Abdelhamid El-Sayad || 11th World Wushu Championships, Final || Ankara, Turkey || Decision (2-0) || 2 || 2:00
|-
|- bgcolor="#CCFFCC"
| 2011-10-14 || Win || align=left| Nacereddine Zemmal || 11th World Wushu Championships, Semi Finals || Ankara, Turkey || Decision (2-0) || 2 || 2:00 
|-
|- bgcolor="#CCFFCC"
| 2011-10-12 || Win || align=left| Velaz Miguel || 11th World Wushu Championships, Quarter Finals || Ankara, Turkey || Decision (2-0) || 2 || 2:00
|-
|- bgcolor="#CCFFCC"
| 2011-10-11 || Win || align=left| Salvador Gajardo Lopez || 11th World Wushu Championships, 1/8 Finals || Ankara, Turkey || Absolute Victory ||  ||
|-
|- bgcolor="#CCFFCC"
| 2011-10-11 || Win || align=left| Amir Fazli || 11th World Wushu Championships, 1/16 Finals || Ankara, Turkey || Decision (2-0) || 2 || 2:00
|-
|- bgcolor="#FFBBBB"
| 2010-08-28 || Loss ||align=left| Xu Jiaheng || 1st World Combat Games, Semi Finals || Beijing, China || Decision (2-1) || 3 || 2:00
|-
|- bgcolor="#CCFFCC"
| 2009-10-30 || Win || align=left| Hamid Reza Gholipour || 10th World Wushu Championships, Final || Toronto, Canada || Decision (2-0) || 2 || 2:00
|-
|- bgcolor="#CCFFCC"
| 2009-10-28 || Win || align=left| Xu Jiaheng || 10th World Wushu Championships, Semi Finals || Toronto, Canada || Decision (2-0) || 2 || 2:00
|-
|- bgcolor="#CCFFCC"
| 2009-10-27 || Win || align=left| Igor Kolacin || 10th World Wushu Championships, Quarter Finals || Toronto, Canada || Decision (2-0) || 2 || 2:00
|-
|- bgcolor="#CCFFCC"
| 2009-10-26 || Win || align=left| Masood Rahimi || 10th World Wushu Championships, 1/8 Finals || Toronto, Canada || Absolute Victory ||  || 
|-
|- bgcolor="#FFBBBB"
| 2009-07-26 || Loss ||align=left| Hamid Reza Gholipour || 8th World Games, Finals || Kaohsiung, Taiwan || ||  || 
|-
|- bgcolor="#CCFFCC"
| 2008-08-24 || Win || align=left| Hossein Ojaghi || 2008 Beijing Wushu Tournament, Final || Beijing, China || Default || || 
|-
|- bgcolor="#CCFFCC"
| 2008-08-23 || Win || align=left| Nick Evagorou || 2008 Beijing Wushu Tournament, Semi Finals || Beijing, China || KO || || 
|-
|- bgcolor="#CCFFCC"
| 2008-08-22 || Win || align=left| Elshad Ibrahimov || 2008 Beijing Wushu Tournament, Quarter Finals || Beijing, China || Default || || 
|-
|- bgcolor="#CCFFCC"
| 2007-11-17 || Win || align=left| Hossein Ojaghi ||  9th World Wushu Championships, Final || Beijing, China || Decision (2-0) || 2 || 2:00
|-
|- bgcolor="#CCFFCC"
| 2007-11-16 || Win || align=left| Nick Evagorou ||  9th World Wushu Championships, Semi Finals || Beijing, China || Absolute Victory || || 
|-
|- bgcolor="#CCFFCC"
| 2007-11-15 || Win || align=left| Eugen Preda ||  9th World Wushu Championships, Quarter Finals || Beijing, China || Decision (2-1) || 3 || 2:00
|-
|- bgcolor="#CCFFCC"
| 2007-11-14 || Win || align=left| Elyorbek Akbarov ||  9th World Wushu Championships, 1/8 Finals || Beijing, China || Absolute Victory ||  || 
|-
|- bgcolor="#CCFFCC"
| 2007-11-12 || Win || align=left| Mohamed Yousef Ramdan ||  9th World Wushu Championships, 1/16 Finals || Beijing, China || Decision (2-0) || 2 || 2:00
|-
|- bgcolor="#CCFFCC"
| 2006-09-23 || Win || align=left| Eslam Ghorbani || 3rd Sanda World Cup, Final || Xi'an, China || Decision || 3 || 2:00
|-
|- bgcolor="#CCFFCC"
| 2006-09-23 || Win || align=left| Daniele Chiofalo || 3rd Sanda World Cup, Semi Finals || Xi'an, China || Decision || 3 || 2:00
|-
|- bgcolor="#CCFFCC"
| 2005-12-14 || Win || align=left| Eslam Ghorbani || 8th World Wushu Championships, Final || Hanoi, Vietnam ||  ||  || 
|-
|- bgcolor="#CCFFCC"
| 2005-12-13 || Win || align=left| Stéphane Attelly || 8th World Wushu Championships, Semi Finals || Hanoi, Vietnam ||  || || 
|-
|- bgcolor="#FFBBBB"
| 2004-11-14 || Loss || align=left| Zheng Yuhao || 2nd Sanda World Cup, 1/8 Finals || Guangzhou, China || Decision || 3 || 
|-
|- bgcolor="#FFBBBB"
| 2003-11-05 || Loss || align=left| Liu Hailong ||  7th World Wushu Championships, 1/8 Finals || Macau, China || Decision || 3 || 2:00
|-

References

External links
 
 

Living people
1984 births
Kumyks
Russian sanshou practitioners
Russian practitioners of Brazilian jiu-jitsu
Russian male mixed martial artists
Dagestani mixed martial artists
Sportspeople from Makhachkala
Ultimate Fighting Championship male fighters
Mixed martial artists utilizing sanshou
Mixed martial artists utilizing Changquan
Mixed martial artists utilizing Shuai Jiao
Mixed martial artists utilizing Brazilian jiu-jitsu
Kunlun Fight MMA Fighters
World Games silver medalists
Competitors at the 2009 World Games
Competitors at the 2008 Beijing Wushu Tournament
World Games medalists in wushu